Fatih is a Turkish word of Arabic language origin meaning "the Conqueror". It may refer to:

Given name
 Fatih (name)

Places
 Başakşehir Fatih Terim Stadium, a football stadium in Başakşehir District, Istanbul, Turkey
 Fatih, a central district of Istanbul Province, Turkey
 Fatih Mosque (disambiguation)l
 Fatih Sultan Mehmet Bridge, a motorway bridge over the Bosphorus, Istanbul, Turkey
 Fatih University, a former private university in Istanbul, Turkey

Other uses
 Fatih (drillship), a drillship of Turkey
 Fatih project, a project of the Turkish government for Movement to Increase Opportunities and Technology
 Fatih (TV series),  a 2013 Turkish television historical drama series